Mentor International (Mentor Foundation) is an international youth development NGO working in the field of substance use disorder prevention. It was founded in 1994 by Queen Silvia of Sweden in collaboration with the World Health Organisation. Current trustees include Yvonne Thunell, current Chairman, Stefan Persson, Chairman of H&M and Bertil Hult, CEO and founder of EF Education First. Honorary board members include Queen Noor of Jordan, Henri, Grand Duke of Luxembourg and Talal bin Abdul-Aziz Al Saud and Turki bin Talal bin Abdul Aziz Al Saud of the Saudi Royal Family.

External links
 

Addiction and substance abuse organizations
Medical and health organizations based in Sweden
1994 establishments in Sweden
Organizations based in Stockholm